The Union Stock Yard Gate, located on Exchange Avenue at Peoria Street, was the entrance to the famous Union Stock Yards in Chicago. The gate was designed by Burnham and Root around 1875, and is the only significant structural element of the stock yards to survive.  It was designated a National Historic Landmark in 1981.  The plaza surrounding the gate also includes the city's principal memorial to its firefighters.

Description
The Union Stock Yard Gate is located on Chicago's South Side, on a plaza in the center of Exchange Avenue at its junction with Peoria Street. This position marked the principal eastern entrance to the stock yards, which occupied several hundred acres to the west. It is a limestone construction with a central main arch flanked by two smaller arches. The piers of the central arch are topped by conical limestone turrets. One of the side arches retains an iron grillwork gate, of a style that both would have originally had. The main gate at one time had an iron portcullis.

History
The Union Stock Yard was established in 1865, as a place to centralize the city's growing meatpacking industry. Its early facilities were constructed out of wood, with some elements later rebuilt in stone.  This gate was designed by Daniel Burnham and John W. Root, who were responsible for the design of other structures in the yards, and constructed in 1879. The gate and an accompanying gatehouse (since demolished), were the only substantial buildings to survive a fire that leveled the yards in 1934. 

Restored in the 1970s, the limestone gate now stands as one of the few reminders of Chicago's past dominance in the meat packing industry. Over the center arch of the gate is a bust of Sherman, stockyard superintendent John D. Sherman's favorite bull. 

The gate was designated an official Chicago Landmark on February 24, 1972, and was added to the National Register of Historic Places on December 27, 1972. It was then designated a National Historic Landmark on May 29, 1981. Directly behind the gate is a memorial statue for Chicago firefighters. The statue is located there because of the Chicago Union Stock Yards Fire, and around the base are engraved the names of all Chicago firefighters ever killed in the line of duty.

See also
List of National Historic Landmarks in Illinois
National Register of Historic Places listings in South Side Chicago

References

External links

Union Stock Yard Gate, a segment from the film Fast Food Nation

Gates in the United States
Firefighting memorials
Labor monuments and memorials
Monuments and memorials in Chicago
Firefighting in the United States
Buildings and structures completed in 1879
Buildings and structures on the National Register of Historic Places in Chicago
Monuments and memorials on the National Register of Historic Places in Illinois
National Historic Landmarks in Chicago
South Side, Chicago
Burnham and Root buildings
Chicago Landmarks